Kessel-Lier was a men's cycling race organized for the last time in 1980. The race was run in the Antwerp Province (Belgium) between Kessel and Lier.

The competition's roll of honor includes the successes of Rik Van Looy and Herman Van Springel.

Winners

References 

Cycle races in Belgium
1954 establishments in Belgium
Defunct cycling races in Belgium
Recurring sporting events established in 1954
Recurring sporting events disestablished in 1980
1980 disestablishments in Belgium